Ernest Weiller (4 August 1863, in Paris – 6 April 1944) also known under the pseudonym Ernest Lerwile, was a French double-bass player and composer.

Biography 
A solo bassist with the Paris Opera, Weiller was responsible for the music of more than 400 songs from before and between the two wars on texts, among others, by Adolphe Jost, Michel Carré and Eugène Héros as well as many pieces for piano, double bass, string instruments, violins and cellos.

Of Jewish origin, Lerwille was dismissed from the Paris Opera in the autumn of 1940 but received an indemnity for his seniority until December 1942.

Bibliography 
 Agnès Terrier, L'orchestre de l'Opéra de Paris: de 1669 à nos jours, 2003,

References

External links 
 Compositions by Lerwille on WorldCat
 Compositions by Weiller on Prestoclassical.uk.com

French classical double-bassists
Male double-bassists
French classical composers
French male classical composers
1863 births
Musicians from Paris
1944 deaths